Philip W. Kantoff is a medical oncologist. He is the chairman and  chief executive officer (CEO) of Convergent Therapeutics. He served as the Chairman of Medicine at Memorial Sloan Kettering Cancer Center between 2015 and 2021. He is best known for his contributions to the impact of DNA abnormalities in prostate cancer and the discovery of therapies for metastatic hormone-sensitive prostate cancer.

Education 

Kantoff grew up in Forest Hills, New York City. He attended Brown University, where he earned his undergraduate and medical degrees through the Program in Liberal Medical Education. He completed his residency in internal medicine at New York University/Bellevue Hospital, followed by a post doctorate at the National Institutes of Health. He then completed his fellowship in medical oncology at the Dana–Farber Cancer Institute.

Career 

Kantoff joined the Dana–Farber Cancer Institute in a full-time position in genitourinary oncology in 1988. He held various roles at Dana-Farber, including director of the Lank Center for Genitourinary Oncology, chief of the Division of Solid Tumor Oncology, and head of the Prostate Cancer Program. He was named the inaugural Nancy and Jerome Kohlberg Professor at Harvard Medical School in 2014.

While at Dana-Farber, he also served as the lead investigator for Dendreon's clinical trials for Sipuleucel-T, a therapeutic vaccine for prostate cancer approved in 2010. After 28 years at Dana-Farber, Kantoff joined Memorial Sloan Kettering Cancer Center in 2015 to replace George J. Bosl as the Chairman of Medicine. He serves as a Professor of Medicine at the Weill Cornell Medical College. Kantoff won two 2018 Prostate Cancer Foundation Challenge Awards, one on Clonal Hematopoiesis and Prostate Cancer and another alongside fellow principal investigator Mark Pomerantz on DNA Damage Repair Alternations in Prostate Cancer. He was also awarded an NCI SPORE grant for prostate cancer from 2001 to 2015 and a NCI Program Project Grant in 2019 on DNA Damage Repair Alterations in Prostate Cancer. In 2018, Kantoff became an independent director at Context Therapeutics.

In 2021, Kantoff was appointed chairman and chief executive officer of Convergent Therapeutics, a pharmaceutical company based in Cambridge, Massachusetts that focuses on radiopharmaceutical cancer therapies. In 2022, Kantoff joined the board of directors of ESSA Pharma.

Significant publications

Awards 
 Inaugural Nancy and Jerome Kohlberg Chair in Medicine, Harvard Medical School
 Giants in Cancer Care
 Elected member, Association of American Physicians, 2018

References 

American medical researchers
Cancer researchers
1955 births
Living people
Brown University alumni
Alpert Medical School alumni